Sprite Lemon+ is a range of primarily lemonade-flavoured soft drinks produced by The Coca-Cola Company in Australia under the Sprite brand. Sprite Lemon+ Zero Sugar is an artificially sweetened version.

History
The predecessor to this brand, Lift was introduced in Australia in the 1990s as a replacement for the Mello Yello brand. Mello Yello had replaced Leed Lemon Soda Squash, which was a variant of the Leed Lemonade brand. The only flavour in the Lift range (besides limited time flavours) was Lemon. In 2015 it was rebranded as Fanta Lemon Lift and then back to the original Lift in 2016 with a flavour change, supposedly making the drink more sour.

Lift was discontinued in the Australian market in September 2022. The Sprite brand was used to launch a new zesty lemon flavour variant with caffeine and marketed as Sprite Lemon+. This flavour was announced by Coca-Cola Europacific Partners on 13 September 2022, following months of rumours on social media.

See also
 Solo (Australian soft drink)

References

Australian drinks
Lemon sodas
Soft drinks
Coca-Cola brands